Zinc finger protein 438 is a protein that in humans is encoded by the ZNF438 gene.

References

Further reading